Tekmeh Dash (also Romanized as Tekmeh Dāsh; also known as Nīkmeh Dāsh, Tīkmeh Dāsh, Tukmahdāsh, Tukmakhdash, and Tūkmeh Dāsh) is a village in Qara Poshtelu-e Bala Rural District, Qara Poshtelu District, Zanjan County, Zanjan Province, Iran. At the 2006 census, its population was 497, in 110 families.

References 

Populated places in Zanjan County